Monsignor Joseph A. Farrell (April 29, 1873 – June 19, 1960) was an Irish-American Catholic priest. He held various positions in the Archdiocese of New York, and was instrumental in the construction of several new parishes in the New York City borough of Staten Island. On Staten Island, he was an early principal of St. Peter's Boys High School.

In 1961, Monsignor Farrell High School was dedicated and named in his honor. The Archbishop of New York at the time, Francis Cardinal Spellman, had written a congratulatory note to Farrell in 1959 on the 60th anniversary of Farrell's ordination, stating that "next high school on Staten Island will bear your honored name."

References

1873 births
1960 deaths
American Roman Catholic priests
Schoolteachers from New York (state)
American people of Irish descent
People from Staten Island
People of the Roman Catholic Archdiocese of New York